Pavithiram is a village in Senthamangalam Taluk, Namakkal district of Tamil Nadu state in India, located 1.5 km from Varagur, 8 km from Erumaipatti and 9 km from Thathaiyangarpet.

Demographics 
As of 2011, the village was home to 915 people and 271 households.

The literacy rate is 64.7%; 72.97% of men and 56.9% of women are literate.

Politics 
The sarpanch (head of village) is elected every five years.

References 

Villages in Namakkal district